HSC Caldera Vista is an Incat-built high speed catamaran owned by Seajets. The vessel was the first fast craft to bear a Manx name. She was also the sixth Isle of Man Steam Packet Company vessel to bear the name Snaefell.

History

Caldera Vista was launched as Hoverspeed France for Sea Containers, for use with Hoverspeed, in 1991; and operated as the Sardegna Express on charter, before returning to Hoverspeed as the SeaCat Boulogne. In 1994, she was again renamed to SeaCat Isle of Man, and put on charter to the Isle of Man Steam Packet Company. She brought with her high charter fees and operation costs; and endangered the career of the [[MS Lady of Mann|Lady of Mann (II)]], the latter being given a much needed lifeline when a freak wave in the River Mersey encountered by the SeaCat Isle of Man twisted the ship's bow and tore off the water-tight visor. The IoMSPC decided not to continue in chartering the ship from Sea Containers, and she was chartered out to ColorSeaCat as the SeaCat Norge.

She returned to Hoverspeed as the SeaCat Norge; and when her owners bought out the IoMSPC in 1996, she returned to the Irish Sea as the SeaCat Isle of Man once again. Briefly going back to Hoverspeed from 1997 until 1998; she returned to the Isle of Man service from 1998 until 2005.

2007 accidentSeaCat Isle of Man became Sea Express 1, and operated for Irish Sea Express in 2005. The next year, she returned to the Steam Packet fleet. In February 2007, the vessel was involved in a collision with a cargo vessel in fog on the River Mersey. Nobody was injured, but the ship was seriously damaged, and took on a large volume of water. Fortunately, by the next day, the ship was stable. The first attempt to tow the ship across the river to drydock had failed, but the second succeeded. In December 2007, the vessel was renamed Snaefell whilst still under repair.

Return to serviceSnaefell moved under her own power for the first time in over a year when she moved from the West Float in Birkenhead to the Pier Head Landing Stage, and then after a detour, headed out on trials which were expected to take three days, and took two. Snaefells first passenger sailing since her accident in 2007 was on 12 May 2008, with the 07:30 sailing to Liverpool. During her time as Snaefell she was conferred the status of Royal Mail Ship.

In May 2009, it was reported in the press that the company is continuing to review the future of the veteran fastcraft in the light of the increased capacity offered by Manannan and poor passenger numbers on the seasonal Belfast and Dublin routes.

On 9 July 2009, an article was published on the Isle of Man Today website stating that Manx ministers were pleading with the Steam Packet Company after they confirmed they were reviewing the future of Snaefell and the services to Belfast and Dublin. This has to be balanced against the fact that the Steam Packet Company previously requested, and was granted, an extension to its User Agreement with the Manx Government. This requires them to provide over 60 sailings each year to Ireland until 2026. Any decision to cease operations to Ireland would therefore either nullify the Agreement or require significant non-performance payments from the Steam Packet.

Engine problems

In July 2010, Snaefell suffered a crank-shaft failure, causing one of her engines to fail. This caused major disruption, as she could not carry out her Liverpool, Belfast and Dublin sailings efficiently as they would take 4 to 5 hours. She continued to operate on three engines until September 2010, when the timetable allowed Manannan to cover her sailings.

Sale to Seajets
In January 2011, the Steam Packet released a statement stating that Snaefell was no longer part of the operational fleet and would not return to service for the 2011 season. The vessel has been reflagged from the United Kingdom to Cyprus. In late April, the vessel was chartered to Seajets and renamed Master Jet. It was then sold to the company in 2012. The vessel operates on the Piraeus-Paros-Naxos-Koufonisia-Amorgos route as of 2015. In 2018 she was renamed Caldera Vista''.

Routes

The vessel operates the following routes:
2019
 Heraklion-Thira-Ios-Paros-Mykonos-Thira-Heraklion (Daily except Saturdays & Tuesdays)
 Heraklion-Thira-Heraklion (Saturday & Tuesday) 
2018
 Heraklion-Thira-Paros-Mykonos-Paros-Thira-Heraklion (Sunday, Wednesday and Thursday)
 Heraklion-Thira-Mykonos-Tinos-Syros-Thira-Heraklion (Monday and Friday)

References

External links
Specifications- http://www.incat.com.au/domino/incat/incatweb.nsf/0/D57C7F8C7F684242CA25730000212024/$File/hull%20026%20mini%20spec.pdf?OpenElement

 Snaefell Specifications - steam-packet.com
 MAIB report into the collision of Sea Express 1 and Alaska Rainbow

Ships of Seajets
Ferries of the United Kingdom
Ferries of the Isle of Man
Ferries of Greece
Merchant ships of Cyprus
Incat high-speed craft
1990 ships
Ships built by Incat